Marco Terminesi (born September 5, 1984, in Woodbridge, Ontario) is a Canadian former soccer player.

Career

Youth and college
Terminesi attended Holy Cross Catholic Academy, and played club soccer for Woodbridge Soccer Club, guiding them to the 1994 and 2000 Robbie International Championship, the 2002 Ontario Cup Championship and the 2003 Showcase Championship.

He played college soccer at the University of Louisville from 2003 to 2007. He was named to the Athletic Director's Honor Roll on three occasions, and was named to the Conference USA All-Freshman team in his debut year, and was the 2008 Big East Scholar Athlete of the Year.

Professional
He began his career in 2008 with the Italia Shooters in the Canadian Soccer League. After spending a year playing indoor soccer with Milwaukee Wave in the Xtreme Soccer League, Terminesi signed with the Minnesota Thunder of the USL First Division in May 2009. He made his debut for the team on May 31, 2009, in a game against the Puerto Rico Islanders. He then joined the Montreal Impact on July 27, 2010. He was released by Montreal on October 12, 2011.

Health issues
In February 2010 Terminesi announced that he likely had a tumor on the pineal gland in the center of the brain, and would be retiring from soccer indefinitely until such time as his health issues had been solved.

He recovered enough to join Montreal Impact in the USSF Division 2 Professional League for the second half of the 2010 season.

Career stats

References

External links
 Louisville profile

1984 births
Living people
Canadian Soccer League (1998–present) players
Canadian soccer players
York Region Shooters players
Louisville Cardinals men's soccer players
Milwaukee Wave players
Minnesota Thunder players
Montreal Impact (1992–2011) players
USL First Division players
USSF Division 2 Professional League players
North American Soccer League players
Xtreme Soccer League players
Major Indoor Soccer League (2008–2014) players
People from Vaughan
Association football forwards
Canadian men's futsal players
Canadian beach soccer players
Rochester Lancers (1967–1980) players